Fraser and Neave, Limited (F&N) is a Singaporean food and beverage, publishing and former brewing and property industries conglomerate. It is owned by Thai Chinese billionaire business magnate Charoen Sirivadhanabhakdi.

Listed in Singapore, the group's subsidiaries and associated companies include Frasers Property, Asia Pacific Breweries and Times Publishing. As of 2011, F&N had total assets of over S$14 billion and employed over 7,890 people in 11 countries.

In January 2014, through a distribution in specie and re-listing of Frasers Centrepoint Limited by way of introduction on the Singapore stock exchange, the group de-merged its properties business.

History

Founding and early history

The company (Singapore and Straits Aerated Water Company) was formed in 1883 by John Fraser and David Chalmers Neave, who diversified from their printing business (Singapore and Straits Printing Office) to pioneer the aerated water business in Southeast Asia in 1883.

In 1898, a new public company was formed and the two businesses were sold to the new company, named Fraser & Neave (F&N), for $290,000 in cash and shares.

Diversification, restructuring, and expansion 
In 1931, Fraser & Neave formed a joint venture with Holland's Heineken to venture into the brewing business. The brewery, Malayan Breweries Limited produced Tiger Beer, and later acquired Archipelago Brewery, which produced Anchor Beer.

In 1936, F&N acquired the Singapore, Malaya and Brunei franchise rights for Coca-Cola drinks. Alongside its own range of F&N branded drinks, the company went on to acquire the rights to other PepsiCo, Coca-Cola, and Cadbury Schweppes brands – such as – 7-Up, Fanta, and Sunkist.

In 1990, Malayan Breweries changed its name to Asia Pacific Breweries.

Modern history

In 1999, F&N purchased a 20% stake in Times Publishing before taking majority control of the company in 2000, with the entire acquisition costing around S$570 million. This put F&N into the printing, publishing, retail bookstore, sales and distribution, education, internet and conference organisation businesses. In 2001, F&N took both Times and Centrepoint Properties private.

In 2006, the Singapore government investment company Temasek Holdings took a 14.9%, S$900 million stake in F&N, becoming F&N's second-largest investor. In 2008, F&N reorganised its management structure and appointed chief executives for three of its core businesses: food & beverage; property; and printing and publishing.

On 27 June 2007, F&N Singapore launched a new logo for its food and beverage business in order to reach the Asia-Pacific market.

In 2010, Temasek's entire stake was sold to Japan's Kirin Holdings for S$1.33 billion.

On 1 September 2011, the three-quarter-century partnership between F&N and Coca-Cola in Malaysia, Singapore and Brunei ended. F&N no longer had the franchise rights to manufacture and market Coca-Cola beverages.

In July 2012, ThaiBev acquired a 22% stake in F&N from Oversea-Chinese Banking Corporation, raising its stake to 24.1%.

In August 2012, F&N accepted an offer from Heineken to acquire its stake in Asia Pacific Breweries for US$4.1 billion.

In September 2012, ThaiBev and its partner TCC Assets, both controlled by Thai Chinese billionaire Charoen Sirivadhanabhakdi, made a move to thwart efforts by Heineken to acquire control of Asia Pacific Breweries, with a S$8.8 billion (US$7.1 billion) cash offer for F&N. Other companies, such as, Coca-Cola and Kirin Holdings, also showed interest for the soft-drink and food businesses of F&N, in order to expand their operations in Asia.

On 28 September 2012, F&N shareholders approved the sale of Asia Pacific Breweries to Heineken during the extraordinary general meeting held.

In 2013, Kirin Holdings sold its 15% stake in F&N to TCC (ThaiBev).

Frasers Centrepoint Limited and Frasers Property (2013–present)
Charoen Sirivadhanabhakdi expanded his ThaiBev drinks and property empire to include about two-thirds of this Singaporean conglomerate. This was possible after Japan's Kirin Brewery Company sold its 15% stake for US$1.6 billion to Sirivadhanabhakdi.

In January 2014, through a distribution in specie and re-listing of Frasers Centrepoint Limited by way of introduction on the Singapore stock exchange, the group de-merged its properties business.

In February 2018, Frasers Centrepoint Limited was renamed Frasers Property globally.

Products
 100Plus
 Borneo
 Carnation (in Malaysia, Singapore, Brunei and Thailand, under license from Nestlé)
 CocoLife
 Daisy (a sweetened condensed creamer brand for Philippine distribution)
 EST Cola
 Farmhouse
 Fruit Tree
 Ice Mountain
 Seasons
 Magnolia
 NutriSoy
 NutriWell
 Oishi
 Ranger
 Sarsi

References

Notes

Bibliography

External links
Official site

Conglomerate companies of Singapore
Companies listed on the Singapore Exchange
Singaporean brands
Food and drink companies of Singapore
1883 establishments in Singapore